Claus Tuchscherer (born 14 January 1955 in Rodewisch, East Germany) is an East German nordic combined skier (until 1976) and then Austrian ski jumper. He finished fifth in the Nordic combined event at the 1976 Winter Olympics in Innsbruck.
On the last day of the event he fled with his Austrian girlfriend to Bischofshofen.

References

Nordic combined skiers at the 1976 Winter Olympics
German male Nordic combined skiers
Living people
1955 births
Olympic Nordic combined skiers of East Germany
Austrian male ski jumpers
People from Rodewisch
East German sportspeople in doping cases
Doping cases in Nordic combined
Sportspeople from Saxony